Burbur-e Vosta (also Romanized as Būrbūr-e Vosţá and Būrbūrā-ye Vosţá; also known as Būrbūrā) is a village in Kakavand-e Gharbi Rural District, Kakavand District, Delfan County, Lorestan Province, Iran. At the 2006 census, its population was 38, in 9 families.

References 

Towns and villages in Delfan County